Censorship in Francoist Spain was mandated by Francisco Franco in Francoist Spain, between 1936-1975. In Francoist Spain, primary subjects of censorship included public display of liberal political ideology, art forms such as literature and film, as well as symbols of foreign, non-conservative ideologies. This censorship was primarily driven by Franco's vision for ideological unity in Spain. As a result, Franco called for the censorship of materials that promoted liberal ideas from abroad, particular those of European origin. Aside from censorship of foreign ideology, symbols of Spanish identity, such as Catalonia, also became primary targets of censorship. Under his authoritarian reign, censorship was imposed primarily through systemic political repression. The Francoist State repressed expression of liberal social and political ideology among the Spanish public.

Aside from strong government censorship, Franco also gained the support of the Catholic Church in perpetuating censorship. Beyond censorship motivated by the Francoist State, individual critics had other, non-political interests that led them to becoming censors as well. For example, individual censors would alter a text for clarity and coherence, or rewrite reviews on grounds of propriety as they deemed fit according to their individual standards. Political censors, on the other hand, would repress visible signs of liberal behavior and seek to paint a positive image of Franco. Given the prevalence of censorship, Francoist Spain was also marked by a robust culture of resistance of censorship. In response to government suppression, Spain saw an era that subsequently fostered a culture of resistance, expressed in various art forms.

Subject matter and agenda

Literature 
In Francoist Spain, repression of political and cultural liberalism was a primary motivator for censors editing various literary works. Some censors had alternative reasons for censoring literary works of foreign authors which was not motivated by Franco's ideology. This was done on grounds that pluralism and cultural diversity would present threats to Spanish unity.  Some writers also participated in self-censorship, aware that they were writing for censors that would review their work.

Translation of literary works from foreign countries underwent comprehensive censorship. In this way, translation served as a means to restructure and alter original versions of various works, rather than a bridge for intercultural exchange. In the case of Francoist Spain, materials would be edited to remove content that was deemed morally objectionable. In conformity to religious influences from the Catholic church, publishers would rephrase and edit these foreign works as necessary. More specifically, censors sought to minimize the potential of influence by European liberalism on Spanish culture. Some censorship of literature continues to the present day as previously censored text have not been updated.  Spanish culture itself had also undergone state censorship. Symbols of Spanish culture, such as Flamenco, were prohibited from public display by Franco's administration.

Critics and reviewers of literature tended to be independent. They wrote reviews and often framed their criticism as a suggestion for greater coherence or clarity of writers' ideas. Novelists during the Franco era often presented strained or troubled relationships between fictional characters as a means to convey their ideas about violence by the state, which would not have been acceptable by state censors. Writers likened violence in the private lives of fictional characters, such as sexual predation or physical violence, to the political sphere of conquest in Francoist Spain.

Film 
In Francoist Spain, film served both as an art form as well as a means of discourse in an era of repression. This repression worked beyond just critics' review of local films. Language politics of Francoist Spain required for dubbing of foreign films in Spain to be adapted to satisfy specific requirements and norms set by Franco's administration. Producers of film, actors and distributors of film were generally aware of these requirements, resulting in wide use of film as a means to engage in major social and political issues.

Among contemporary scholars, Spanish national film during the Francoist State is often interpreted as a signal of political, social, economic and cultural transition, specifically as the nation's transition from traditional values to modern ones. Film producers and performers are often perceived as resisting the repression imposed by the Francoist State through script writing and performance in film. In 1937, a set of guidelines was issued to emphasize that cultural morality must be preserved through centralized control of the cinema. Censorship boards were founded in order to properly revise and censor foreign works entering Spain. In 1938, state institutions such as the National Commission of Film Censorship were established. These state institutions were tasked with ensuring the moral integrity of the content in films. Examples of content that were unacceptable included content that depicted divorce, theft, sensuality and revealing clothing. They screened films for content that had potential to cause disorder, panic or violence.

Women's rights, particularly women's working rights, were formally recognized by the state in the 1963 Development Plan. However, conservative Catholicism remained the primary source of guidance in personal and public conduct. This perceived ideological tension led to an era in which Spanish national film became interested in depictions of gender roles, with many films addressing the tension between tradition and modernity. In displaying traditional gender roles of women in film, state institutions tended to approve these films, perceived as depictions of peaceful, everyday life.

Peripheral nationalisms 

Catalonia under the rule of Franco underwent extensive censorship and repression following Franco's victory over nationalists. After the end of the Spanish civil war, intellectuals with visible Catalan ideologies were punished in various ways, including execution, subjugation and forced labor. Along with the imprisonment, execution and exile of these individuals, traces of Catalan identity were removed from formal use, such as newspapers, state education and magazines. This was done on grounds of linguistic cohesiveness, which made publishing difficult in Catalan.

In the mid-1950s, when Francoist Spain reoriented its policies and introduced a stabilization plan to include Spain in the European market, a small network of student opposition movements began to emerge. Their goal was to preserve Catalan identity under the Francoist State. As a result of increased foreign investment by the Spanish government, there was an increase in the publication of books in Catalan. By 1962, there were as many as 270 books published in Catalan. From there, increases in publication was minor, as there was not enough interest nor state support to continue producing these books.

References 

Censorship in Spain
Francoist Spain
Human rights abuses in Spain